Sahim  (full name Samim Winiger) is a Swiss producer of electronic dance music.

Biography
Winiger is of Iranian descent. With Michal Ho, he released several tracks under the name Samim & Michal. He has also worked with Jay Haze as Bearback and Fuckpony.

In 2004, Samim temporarily stopped his work after he developed cancer. However, shortly after he brought out several 12-inch singles. His breakthrough in Europe was in the summer of 2007, with the eccentric accordion-techno track "Heater" which became a summer hit and was included on the Ministry of Sound 2008 compilation The Rush. The single was released in the Netherlands on 27 September 2007 and reached number 6 in the Dutch top 40. It also reached number 12 in the UK Singles Chart.

In September 2007, his first solo-album, Flow, also appeared. A second album, Kook Kook, was released in 2009.

Discography

Albums
Flow (2007), Get Physical

Singles
Eternally Collapsing Object EP (2006), Moon Harbour
"Do You See the Light?" (2007), Circus Company
"Heater" (2007), Get Physical

References

Year of birth missing (living people)
Living people
Swiss house musicians
Swiss people of Iranian descent